Best Director Award (Vietnamese: Giải đạo diễn xuất sắc nhất) is one of the awards presented at the Vietnam Film Festival to recognize a filmmaker with the achievement in directing which has been determined the best by the juries of feature film, direct-to-video, documentary film and animated film categories.

History 
The category was awarded for the first time in the 2nd Vietnam Film Festival (1973). Đặng Nhật Minh, Đào Trọng Khánh and Phạm Minh Trí are all holding the record with three awards. They respectively represents their categories 'Feature film', 'Documentary film' and 'Animated film'. Director Nguyễn Hoàng Lâm was also awarded three but two of them is for the science films and the other is for a documentary.

The achievement in a direct-to-video feature film, which was first awarded in the 9th Vietnam Film Festival (1990), is no longer awarded since the 20th Vietnam Film Festival (2017). It is because this category has been removed.

Awards

Notes 
In some cases, the 'Best Director' award was considered by the jury as an alternative to the Golden Lotus award, which awarded to Best Film, such as the case of director Đặng Nhật Minh with the film "Thương nhớ đồng quê" at the 11th Vietnam Film Festival (1996).
Before the 15th Vietnam Film Festival (2007), Documentary film and Science film were counted as one category for judging and grading.

References 

Vietnam Film Festival
Awards for best director